Dinga is a city , District Gujrat, in the Punjab province of Pakistan. 

It lies between the rivers Jhelum and Chenab. The main highway that runs from Lahore to Rawalpindi is about 23 km (16.7 mi) northeast of Deengah. Deengah is about 100 km (62 mi) from the border that separates Pakistan and India. Population of Deengah was 50,793 per the 2017 census.

Notable places 
Dinga Railway station

References 

Populated places in Gujrat District